Siirt is an electoral district of the Grand National Assembly of Turkey. It elects three members of parliament (deputies) to represent the province of the same name for a four-year term by the D'Hondt method, a party-list proportional representation system.

Members 
Population reviews of each electoral district are conducted before each general election, which can lead to certain districts being granted a smaller or greater number of parliamentary seats. Siirt's seat allocation has been remained unchanged at three seats since 1991.

Siirt is distinctive as being the site of a by-election, a rarity in Turkish politics, which in 2003 saw Recep Tayyip Erdoğan elected to parliament after a law barring candidates with criminal convictions from standing was amended. Erdoğan subsequently became prime minister.

More recently, Siirt was a district where the pro-Kurdish Peace and Democracy Party (BDP) ran independent candidates in an attempt to overcome the 10 percent national electoral threshold. One independent candidate was elected here in 2011 and has since joined the BDP.

General elections

2002 
This election was successfully challenged by the AK Party arguing that a boycott by in villagers in Doğan, near Pervari in Siirt, and the absence of an electoral board for the region rendered the vote invalid. A fresh ballot was held on 9 March 2003.

2003

2007

2011

June 2015

November 2015

2018

Presidential elections

2014

References 

Electoral districts of Turkey
Politics of Siirt Province